Pendleton's Lithography (1825–1836) was a lithographic print studio in 19th-century Boston, Massachusetts, established by brothers William S. Pendleton (1795-1879) and John B. Pendleton (1798-1866). Though relatively short-lived, in its time the firm was prolific, printing portraits, landscape views, sheet music covers, and numerous other illustrations. The Pendleton's work might be characterized by its generosity—each print contains a maxima of visual information designed for graphic reproduction.

History
Originally from New York, the Pendleton brothers at the outset of their professional lives were affiliated with Charles Willson Peale and Rembrandt Peale in Philadelphia. On arrival in Boston, William Pendleton first worked as an engraver with Abel Bowen.

The Pendleton brothers began their own shop in 1825, when William "acquired some lithographic materials from a merchant named Thaxter who had brought them to Boston from Europe but who did not know how to use them. W.S. Pendleton communicated with his brother, then in Europe, about the matter, and the latter on his return not only brought back considerable stone and other materials, but also what was more important several men familiar with the process." The Pendletons became "the pioneers of the lithographic art in Boston."

A number of artists worked for the Pendletons, including Fitz Henry Lane, John H. Bufford, Seth Cheney, Nathaniel Currier, Thomas Edwards, B.F. Nutting, George Loring Brown, Benjamin Champney, Alexander Jackson Davis, David Claypoole Johnston, William Rimmer, and John W. A. Scott. Also "associated with the Pendleton workshop: Mary Jane Derby (later Peabody), Eliza Ann Farrar, Eliza Goodridge, Orra White Hitchcock, Louisa Davis Minot, Eliza Susan Quincy, Catherine Scollay, ... Margaret Snow (who married William S. Pendleton in 1831)," and probably Sophia Peabody.

In 1826 the brothers won "a silver medal for the best specimen of lithography" at the annual exhibition of the Franklin Institute, Philadelphia. In addition to critical praise, the studio's work garnered public approval. Of an 1832 portrait of Andrew Jackson, painted by Ralph E. W. Earl, and printed by Pendleton's, one newspaper notes: "We have received a lithographic engraving of Mr. Earle's picture of Gen. Jackson. ...The whole appears to be finely executed. The engraving is by Pendleton of Boston -- we have never seen any lithography equal to it."

The studio occupied successive addresses in Boston:  Harvard Place (1825-1826); Graphic Court (1826 - c. 1832); and finally Washington Street (c. 1836).

In 1828, John Pendleton left Boston. William continued on until "July 1836 when ... [he] sold out to his bookkeeper, Thomas Moore." According to one historian, after William's departure the staff and operations of the business he'd established remained in place—"for all practical purposes it was the Pendleton operation under a new name"—until 1840 "when Moore in turn sold out to Benjamin W. Thayer."

Images
Works printed by Pendleton's Lithography

References

Further reading

Works illustrated by Pendleton's Lithography

Works about Pendleton's Lithography

External links

 University of Pennsylvania. Keffer Collection of Sheet Music.
 New York Public Library. Works by Pendleton's Lithography
 Library of Congress. Prints & Photographs Division. Works by Pendleton's Lithography.
 Boston Athenaeum. Works by Pendleton's Lithography.

1836 disestablishments
American lithographers
19th-century lithographers
Economic history of Boston
Cultural history of Boston
Financial District, Boston
19th century in Boston
1820s in the United States
1830s in the United States
Manufacturing companies established in 1825